Sanchaman Limboo (15 January 1947 – 8 November 2020) was the fourth Chief Minister of Sikkim. He was Chief Minister in Sikkim for 179 days. During his period the central act of Other Backward Classes (OBC) was enforced in Sikkim.

Limboo died on 8 November 2020 after a long illness at the age of 73.

References 

1947 births
2020 deaths
People from Gangtok
Sikkim politicians
Chief Ministers of Sikkim
Sikkim Sangram Parishad politicians
Limbu people
Sikkim MLAs 1979–1984
Sikkim MLAs 1985–1989
Sikkim MLAs 1989–1994